Fernando Noriega (born June 18, 1979), is a Mexican television actor.

Filmography

Nominations

References

External links 

Living people
Mexican male telenovela actors
Mexican male television actors
Mexican people of Asturian descent
Male actors from Mexico City
1979 births
21st-century Mexican male actors